This is a list of earthquakes in 1942. Only magnitude 6.0 or greater earthquakes appear on the list. Lower magnitude events are included if they have caused death, injury or damage. Events which occurred in remote areas will be excluded from the list as they wouldn't have generated significant media interest. All dates are listed according to UTC time. This year saw an average number of magnitude 7.0+ events. The dominant event this year in terms of deaths was in December in Turkey with 1,000 of the 1,489 deaths for the year. Other deadly events occurred elsewhere in Turkey. Ecuador, China and Albania had earthquakes causing dozens of deaths. An unusually large quake struck the Southwest Indian Ridge in November with a magnitude of 8.0. Spreading ridges usually have smaller magnitude events.

Overall

By death toll 

 Note: At least 10 casualties

By magnitude 

 Note: At least 7.0 magnitude

Notable events

January

February

March

April

May

June

July

August

September

October

November

December

References

1942
 
1942